Yoshioka is a Japanese surname. Notable people with the surname include:

Hideki Yoshioka (born 1972), Japanese footballer
Hidetaka Yoshioka (born 1970), Japanese actor
Junko Yoshioka, Japanese fashion designer
Kazuya Yoshioka (born 1978), Japanese ski jumper
Kiyoe Yoshioka (born 1984), Japanese singer
, Japanese sailor
Osamu Yoshioka (1934-2010), Japanese lyricist
Satoshi Yoshioka (born 1987), Japanese footballer
Senzō Yoshioka (1916–2005), Japanese photographer
Takao Yoshioka, Japanese screenwriter
Takayoshi Yoshioka (1909-1984), Japanese athlete
Tokujin Yoshioka (born 1970), Japanese artist
Toshiki Yoshioka (born 1976), Japanese racing driver
Yoshioka Yayoi (1871-1959), Japanese physician
Yui Yoshioka (born 1987), Japanese singer

Japanese-language surnames